Matteo Restivo (born 4 November 1994) is an Italian swimmer. He competed at the 2020 Summer Olympics, in 200 m backstroke.

He competed in the men's 200 metre backstroke event at the 2017 World Aquatics Championships.

References

External links
 

1994 births
Living people
Sportspeople from Udine
Italian male swimmers
Italian male backstroke swimmers
European Aquatics Championships medalists in swimming
Swimmers at the 2018 Mediterranean Games
Mediterranean Games competitors for Italy
Mediterranean Games medalists in swimming
Mediterranean Games gold medalists for Italy
Mediterranean Games silver medalists for Italy
Swimmers at the 2020 Summer Olympics
Olympic swimmers of Italy
Swimmers at the 2022 Mediterranean Games
21st-century Italian people